Església de Sant Pere Màrtir, Escaldes-Engordany  is a church located in Escaldes-Engordany, Andorra. It is a heritage property registered in the Cultural Heritage of Andorra. It was built in 1956–1981.

References

Escaldes-Engordany
Roman Catholic churches in Andorra
Cultural Heritage of Andorra
Buildings and structures completed in 1981